Musik, dans & party 8 is a 1993 studio album by Sten & Stanley.

Track listing
"Rosor doftar alltid som mest när det skymmer" (Gunnarsson - Lord)
"Snälla du" ("Lover Please") (B. Swan - I. Forsman)
"Jag skriver sånger" (P. Bergqvist - H. Backström)
"Hello Josephine" (A. Domino - D. Bartholomew)
"Är det kärlek på gång" (S. Nilsson - K. Almgren)
"Nere i hamnen" ("Under the Boardwalk") (A. Resnick - K. Young - I. Forsman)
"När du skrattar och ler" (B. Nilsson)
"Blommor och bin" ("The Birds and the Bees") (B. Newman - B. Stuart - K. Almgren)
"Är du ensam du som jag" (Gunnarsson - Lord)
"En så'n underbar känsla" ("It's a Real Good Feeling") (V. Promo - H. Steinhauer - E. Nilsson - A. Svensson)
"Sänd inga rosor mer" (E. Nilsson - A. Svensson)
"Candida" (T. Wine - I. Levine - I. Forsman)
"Glöm inte bort mig" (Gunnarsson - Lord)
"Blueberry Hill" (A. Lewis - L. Stock - V. Rose)
"Söndag min lediga dag" ("Beautiful Sunday") (D. Boone - R. McQueen - A-G. Glenmark)
"Mitt hjärta" (M. Ekwall)

References 

1993 albums
Sten & Stanley albums